Parks is a census-designated place (CDP) in Coconino County, Arizona, United States. The population was 1,188 at the 2010 census.

Geography
Parks is located at  (35.291355, -111.958898).

Demographics

As of the census of 2000, there were 1,137 people, 462 households, and 342 families residing in the CDP.  The population density was 6.6 people per square mile (2.5/km2).  There were 918 housing units at an average density of 5.3/sq mi (2.1/km2).  The racial makeup of the CDP was 93.7% White, 0.4% Black or African American, 0.7% Native American, 0.4% Asian, 0.5% Pacific Islander, 1.8% from other races, and 2.6% from two or more races.  5.2% of the population were Hispanic or Latino of any race.

There were 462 households, out of which 29.2% had children under the age of 18 living with them, 63.6% were married couples living together, 5.8% had a female householder with no husband present, and 25.8% were non-families. 18.6% of all households were made up of individuals, and 5.4% had someone living alone who was 65 years of age or older.  The average household size was 2.46 and the average family size was 2.78.

In the CDP, the age distribution of the population shows 22.6% under the age of 18, 3.9% from 18 to 24, 29.2% from 25 to 44, 34.3% from 45 to 64, and 10.0% who were 65 years of age or older.  The median age was 43 years. For every 100 females, there were 109.0 males.  For every 100 females age 18 and over, there were 106.6 males.

The median income for a household in the CDP was $39,886, and the median income for a family was $45,000. Males had a median income of $34,500 versus $27,875 for females. The per capita income for the CDP was $19,377.  About 6.4% of families and 9.2% of the population were below the poverty line, including 9.6% of those under age 18 and 5.7% of those age 65 or over.

References

External links
Parks, Arizona, photo gallery and profile at CityData.com

Census-designated places in Coconino County, Arizona
U.S. Route 66 in Arizona